Long Whatton and Diseworth, formerly just Long Whatton is a civil parish in the North West Leicestershire district of Leicestershire, England. The parish includes the villages of Long Whatton and Diseworth. The population of the parish at the 2011 census was 1,760.

The Donington Park motorway service area, a large part of East Midlands Airport, and a smaller part of the East Midlands Gateway freight terminal all lie in the northern part of the civil parish.

History 
On 1 April 1936 the parish of Diseworth was merged with Long Whatton, parts of Hathern and Shepshed was also merged, on 4 August 1999 the parish was renamed "Long Whatton & Diseworth".

References

External links 
Long Whatton and Diseworth Parish Council web site

Civil parishes in Leicestershire
North West Leicestershire District